In My Little Corner of the World is the second studio album by American country music singer Marie Osmond. It was released on MGM Records in 1974.

Marie Osmond's second album was named after the lead and only single from the album, "In My Little Corner of the World." Like Osmond's previous singles, the crossover country-pop hit, "Paper Roses," "In My Little Corner of the World" was a cover version of a major hit by Anita Bryant. Osmond's version however only peaked within the Country Top 40 and made the Bubbling Under Hot 100 charts in 1974. The album was produced by Sonny James. Recorded at Columbia Studios, Studio B Nashville, TN

The album peaked at #10 on the Billboard Top Country Albums and #164 on the Billboard 200 in 1974.
The album was given 2 out of 5 stars by Allmusic.

Track listing

Chart positions
Album – Billboard (United States)

Singles - Billboard (United States)

References

1974 albums
Marie Osmond albums
MGM Records albums